No Way to Treat a Lady can refer to:
 No Way to Treat a Lady (novel), a 1964 novel by William Goldman
 No Way to Treat a Lady (film), a 1968 film adaptation of the novel, starring Rod Steiger
 No Way to Treat a Lady (album), a 1975 album by Helen Reddy

See also
 "Ain't No Way to Treat a Lady"